East Ascension High School, commonly referred to as EA, is a public high school in Gonzales, Louisiana, United States. It is within the Ascension Parish School Board.

As of 2010, the principal is Traci McCorkle, the associate principal is Lauren Lambert Avery, and the four assistant principals are Kim Uzee, Walter Traveler, Allison Brigniac, and Tracy Swacker. The school mascot is the spartan, and the school colors are royal blue and gold. The school newspaper is The Spartan Lance, a member of the High School National Ad Network. Gonzales Middle School and Central Middle School feed into EA.

Demographics as of August 2016

Athletics
East Ascension High athletics competes in the LHSAA.

Notable alumni
Alicia Morton graduated in 2005. Morton is a former actress who is best known for her role as Annie Bennett-Warbucks in Annie (1999 film). This was the second screen adaptation of the stage musical Annie after the 1982 film of the same name.

Glenn Dorsey graduated in 2004.  Dorsey played defensive line and was a High School All-State selection in 2003 and 2004.  Dorsey was a two-time All-American football player at Louisiana State University in 2006 and 2007 and was named the Southeastern Conference defensive player of the year in 2007.  Dorsey also finished ninth in the 2007 Heisman Trophy voting. He was the fifth selection in the first round by the Kansas City Chiefs in the 2008 NFL Draft. Dorsey signed a two-year contract with the San Francisco 49ers before the 2013 season. In Dorsey's first six seasons he has compiled six sacks and 279 tackles.

John McConnell (actor) was born in 1958, nicknamed Spud.  McConnell is an actor best known for his work in films such as O Brother, Where Art Thou?, Django Unchained, 12 Years a Slave, and A Confederacy of Dunces. McConnell was also an afternoon radio personality, hosting a daily call-in talk show, "The Spud Show", on WWL 870 AM until 2015.

Shawn Nelson (American football) graduated in 2004. Nelson played tight end at University of Southern Mississippi where he was a first-team All-Conference USA selection in 2006 and 2007 and MVP of the 2005 New Orleans Bowl.  He was a fourth round selection of the Buffalo Bills in the 2009 NFL Draft. In 2 seasons with the Bills, Nelson had 20 catches for 181 yards and a touchdown.

David Brown (writer) graduated in 1997. He writes under the pseudonym D. B. Grady. He is a correspondent for The Atlantic and author of Deep State: Inside the Government Secrecy Industry.

Andrew Glover (American football) graduated in 1987, nicknamed Poncho.  Glover played tight end at Grambling State University and was drafted by Los Angeles Raiders in 1991.  Glover also went on to play for the Minnesota Vikings and the New Orleans Saints over his nine-year NFL career.

Mike Mohler was born in 1968, was a Major League Baseball pitcher drafted in 1989 by the Oakland Athletics.  Played for four teams during his eight-year pro baseball career.

References

External links
East Ascension High School Website
East Ascension High School Band Website

Educational institutions established in 1966
Schools in Ascension Parish, Louisiana
Public high schools in Louisiana
1966 establishments in Louisiana